Survivor South Africa: Return of the Outcasts is the ninth season of the South African reality competition show, Survivor South Africa. Announced on 25 November 2021, the season was scheduled for broadcast on M-Net in July 2022. The season is the first all-returning player season of Survivor South Africa. Return of the Outcasts is the seventh season hosted by Nico Panagio and was produced by Afrokaans Film & Television. For this season, the grand prize was doubled to R2 million. The season premiered on 18 July 2022 airing four episodes a week, and the cast was announced on 5 June 2022; with the tribe division based upon if castaways had made it to the merge portion of their previous season or not. On the season finale, broadcast on 25 August 2022, Season 8 Pre-Merger, Dino Paulo, was crowned Sole Survivor in a 7-2 vote against Season 5 Post-Merger, Shane Hattingh.

Contestants

The cast is composed of 20 returning players from past seasons of Survivor South Africa. The blue 'Masu' tribe consists of 10 players who made the merge on their previous season, while the red 'Yontau' tribe were 10 players who only played in the pre-merge portion of their respective seasons. The tribe names – Yontau and Masu – come from the Vulcan words for fire and water respectively. The tribes were randomly shuffled on Day 12, with 15 players left in the game. With an advantage hidden in the game, Marian used Diplomatic Immunity to swap from Yontau to Masu on Day 18. After Tribal Council on Day 19, the final 11 players merged to form the yellow 'Salan' (Vulcan for wind) tribe.

Notes

Season summary
The game began with 20 players divided into two tribes competing for a 2-million Rand prize. The players who were eliminated post-merge in their prior season made up the blue Masu tribe, while the players who were eliminated pre-merge in their prior season made up the red Yontau tribe. Though Masu lost the first two immunity challenges, a win streak gave them the numbers going into a tribe swap. The most prolific alliances on each starting tribe were the Breakfast Club on Masu made up primarily of past in-game relationships (which later birthed a "Full Package" trio among Steffi, Marian, and Meryl that gained power due to the advantages the women obtained) and the No-B.S. Alliance on Yontau between Dino, Felix, and Phil. The Philippines players found themselves outnumbered on both tribes, resulting in early eliminations for players like PK, Tevin, and Palesa, the latter of which was the result of a surprise double Tribal Council that took place right before the merge.

The new Salan tribe saw the Breakfast Club and the No-B.S. Alliance vying for power. The latter alliance ultimately won out by convincing the others to turn on each other and blindside Dante, the perceived strategic leader of the Breakfast Club. This gave Dino, Felix, and Phil the ammunition they needed to dismantle the Breakfast Club (voting out free agents Tejan and Killarney in the process as well), but the three of them eventually also turned on each other. Phil went on an unprecedented immunity run to keep himself safe, but his luck ran out at the Final 4.

Dino, Shane, and Marian made up the final three. Dino won the final immunity challenge with the castaways' loved ones present, and his fiancee urged him to do what he needs to do (that being, vote out Marian as the bigger threat between her and Shane). At the Final Tribal Council, Dino's strategic dominance won out over Shane's perseverance despite being an underdog, and the jury voted him the sole survivor in a 7-2 decision.
  

In the case of multiple tribes or castaways who win reward or immunity, they are listed in order of finish, or alphabetically where it was a team effort; where one castaway won and invited others, the invitees are in brackets.
Notes

Episodes

Voting history

References

External links

Survivor South Africa seasons
2022 South African television seasons
Television shows filmed in South Africa